Suhas Dwarkanath Kande is a politician. He is a member of Maharashtra Legislative Assembly from Nandgaon Vidhan Sabha constituency as a member of the Shiv Sena. About his family, he has a single child named Devika Suhas Kande.

Positions held
 2019: Elected to Maharashtra Legislative Assembly

References

External links
  Shivsena Home Page 

Shiv Sena politicians
Living people
Year of birth missing (living people)